Colorama may refer to:

Colorama (album), a 1999 album by The Flyin' Ryan Brothers
Colorama (band), a British psych folk band
Kodak Colorama, an American photographic display
 Colorama, an American name for the Cinebox
 "Colorama," a segment in the Futurama episode "Reincarnation"